The 2019–20 season is F.C. Motagua's 73rd season in existence and the club's 54th consecutive season in the top fight of Honduran football.  In addition to the domestic league, the club will also compete for the 2019 Honduran Cup, the 2019 CONCACAF League. and the 2020 CONCACAF Champions League.

Overview
Coach Diego Vásquez renewed his contract, he will be leading the team for his 12th consecutive tournament.  Vásquez reached 240+ consecutive games as Motagua's manager, a club's and league record.  In August 2019, the club announced the re-signing of defender Emilio Izaguirre, who returned to Motagua almost a decade later after his successful venture at Celtic F.C.  On 25 September 2019, the club officially qualified to the 2020 CONCACAF Champions League through their participation at the 2019 CONCACAF League.  On 31 October, Motagua qualified to their 2nd straight CONCACAF League final after defeating Alianza F.C. with a 4–1 aggregated score.  However, in the final series, they weren't able to conquer the tournament as they lost to Deportivo Saprissa with a 0–1 aggregate score.  In the Apertura tournament, Motagua was able to qualify to the Final 5 Stage (Pentagonal), however felt short against C.D. Olimpia and failed to qualify to their seventh straight final series.

In the second semester of the season, F.C. Motagua faced Atlanta United FC in the Round of 16 at the 2020 CONCACAF Champions League, where they couldn't advance after falling 1–4 on aggregated score.

Kits
The 2019–20 home, away and third kits were published on 27 June.  On 1 October, the club released an all-pink jersey to support breast cancer awareness.

Players

Transfers in

Transfers out

Squad
 Statistics as of 14 March 2020
 Only league matches into account

Goalkeeper's action
 As of 14 March 2020

International caps
 As of 17 November 2019
This is a list of players that were playing for Motagua during the 2019–20 season and were called to represent Honduras at different international competitions.

Results
All times are local CST unless stated otherwise

Preseason and friendlies

Apertura

Clausura

Honduran Cup

CONCACAF League

CONCACAF Champions League

By round

Statistics
 As of 14 March 2020

External links
 Official website

References

F.C. Motagua seasons
Motagua
Motagua
Motagua